Zéralda is a district in Algiers Province, Algeria. It was named after its capital, Zéralda. It is the least populous district in the province, and used to be part of Tipaza Province.

Municipalities
The district is further divided into five municipalities:
Zéralda
Staouéli
Souidania
Rahmania
Mahelma

Notable people
 Mohamed Belhocine, Algerian medical scientist, professor of internal medicine and epidemiology.

References

Districts of Algiers Province